William Henry Hines (March 15, 1856 – January 17, 1914) was an American politician who served as a Democratic member of the U.S. House of Representatives for Pennsylvania's 12th congressional district from 1893 to 1895.

Early life and education
William Henry Hines was born in Brooklyn, New York.  He moved to Pennsylvania in 1865 with his parents, who settled in Hanover Township, Pennsylvania.  He attended the public schools in Brooklyn and Wyoming Seminary in Kingston, Pennsylvania.  He studied law and was admitted to the bar in Luzerne County, Pennsylvania, in 1881.

Career
Hines was appointed town clerk of Hanover Township, Pennsylvania, in 1876 and elected assessor in 1877.

He served as a National Greenback member of the Pennsylvania State House of Representatives for Lackawanna and Luzerne County from 1879 to 1880 and as a Democratic member from 1883 to 1884.  He  served as a member of the Pennsylvania State Senate for the 21st district from 1888 to 1892. Hines was elected as a Democrat to the Fifty-third Congress.  He was an unsuccessful candidate for re-election in 1894.

He worked as president of the Pocono Water Company and had unsuccessful campaigns for judge in the Pennsylvania Court of Common Pleas for Luzerne County in 1911 and 1913.

He resumed the practice of law in Wilkes-Barre and died there in 1914.  Interment in St. Mary's Cemetery in Hanover Township, Luzerne County, Pennsylvania.

References

Sources

The Political Graveyard

|-

|-

1856 births
1914 deaths
19th-century American lawyers
19th-century American politicians
20th-century American lawyers
Burials in Pennsylvania
Democratic Party members of the United States House of Representatives from Pennsylvania
Democratic Party members of the Pennsylvania House of Representatives
Pennsylvania Greenbacks
Pennsylvania lawyers
Democratic Party Pennsylvania state senators
Politicians from Brooklyn
Politicians from Wilkes-Barre, Pennsylvania
Wyoming Seminary alumni